Jim Denny (born 13 March 1950 in Paisley, Scotland) is a Scottish retired professional footballer.

Denny joined Rangers in 1970 from junior side Yoker Athletic. He made his debut in the Scottish Cup final replay against Celtic on 12 May 1971. He deputised at right back in place of Sandy Jardine, but the team lost the match 2–1.

In total he made 54 appearances for Rangers including the first match of the 1971–72 European Cup Winners' Cup campaign, a 1–1 draw with Stade Rennes. He left Ibrox in 1979 after seven seasons and joined Hearts. He was played more in Edinburgh in two seasons than he had in the seven he was at Rangers. His spell at Tynecastle was followed by a final season at Stirling Albion before left the senior ranks to join Irvine Victoria. He later joined Dalry Thistle before spending a final few seasons at Troon, where he was Player of the Year in 1984-85 under Manager Davie McIlroy.

External links

1950 births
Living people
Association football defenders
Rangers F.C. players
Heart of Midlothian F.C. players
Stirling Albion F.C. players
Scottish footballers
Scottish Junior Football Association players
Troon F.C. players
Irvine Victoria F.C. players
Scottish Football League players
Footballers from Paisley, Renfrewshire
Yoker Athletic F.C. players